Robert Peter Moore (born 28 November 1984) is a British Conservative Party politician, who has been the Member of Parliament (MP) for Keighley in West Yorkshire since the 2019 general election.

Early life
Moore grew up in a family of farmers in Lincolnshire. In 2007, the family set up a plastics-recycling business.

He studied architecture at Newcastle University and rural surveying at the University College of Estate Management. A qualified rural chartered surveyor, he set up his own consultancy practice, Brockthorpe Consultancy.

Political career
Before being elected as MP for Keighley in 2019, Moore was a councillor on Alnwick Town Council and represented Alnwick on Northumberland County Council. He unsuccessfully contested the July 2019 by-election for Northumbria Police and Crime Commissioner, but at the general election in December, he gained the marginal seat of Keighley from the Labour incumbent, John Grogan.

Electoral history

2019 UK general election

2019 Northumbria Police and Crime Commissioner by-election

2017 Northumberland County Council election

References

External links 
Robbie Moore Official website

1984 births
Living people
Conservative Party (UK) MPs for English constituencies
UK MPs 2019–present
People from Market Rasen
People from Alnwick
People from Keighley
People from Ilkley